On 29 December 2022, a major fire broke out on the Second Gyeongin Expressway near Gwacheon, South Korea, leaving five dead and 37 others injured.

References

2022 disasters in South Korea
2022 fires in Asia
December 2022 events in South Korea
Transport in Gwacheon
Building and structure fires in South Korea
Fire
Tunnel fires
Bridge disasters caused by fire